is a Japanese black metal band formed in the early 1980s. On some releases, they showcase a more thrash- and heavy metal-influenced sound.

History 
Sabbat started in 1983 when a band called Evil consisting of bassist Gezol, guitarists Ozny and Elizaveat, drummer Valvin and vocalist Toshiya was formed. Except for Ozny they had been playing together since 1981 in high school bands like Aburamushi, Hot Rod and Black Beast. With the high school bands they played mostly cover versions of new wave of British heavy metal acts like Iron Maiden and Demon, but with Evil the aim was immediately set higher. The band started to write material of their own and the first gig was played in August 1983.

In early 1984, Toshiya left the band and Gezol started to take care of vocals as well. During the summer the foursome decided to make the band a number one priority in their lives and the name of the band changed to Sabbat. The foundation for their history was laid and during the autumn Sabbat delivered their hard, raw and fast metal spiced with Venom covers to the audiences in their hometown of Kuwana and the surrounding area.

In April 1985, Sabbat recorded two songs for their first single. The single was released by Gezol's own record label Evil Records and the pressing was 300 copies. In June, Sabbat went through the first line-up change as Gezol's brother Samm (aka Gero) replaced Valvin on drums.

In 1986, Sabbat were busy playing gigs throughout Japan which resulted in an appearance at Under The Castle festival on August 3 that was broadcast on television. Less than two weeks later they found themselves in a middle of a crisis. The second night of a two-night gig in Tokyo was played without Ozny who had engaged in an altercation (beating a man who had reportedly given him the finger) after the first night's show. Two weeks later Ozny played one more gig with Sabbat but after that it was mutually agreed that he was out of the band and Sabbat would continue as a trio.

In June 1987, Sabbat entered the studio again to record their second 7" record entitled Born by Evil Blood. Again the record was released by Evil Records and things looked bright until August came with yet another setback. Because of a death in the family circle Gezol and Samm decided to stop playing live. The farewell show was played in Nagoya on September 13 in front of only 43 people.

The decision not to play live was not the end of Sabbat. In October the band was in the studio again and in early 1988 Evil Records released The third 7" record entitled Desecration, and a year later The Devil's Sperm Is Cold.

With these 7" singles and EPs, Sabbat had started to gain popularity also outside Japan and in early 1989 Gezol wanted to return to the limelight. Unfortunately, Elizaveat was not quite as fond of the idea and Samm had already joined Sacrifice. Despite all this, Sabbat played a gig in May with one-night-only line-up: Gezol (bass guitar), Barraveat (guitar), Zorugelion (drums) and Possessed Hammer (vocals). Eventually Gezol succeeded to persuade Elizaveat to play live with Sabbat one more time and the official reunion gig was played October 10 with the following line-up: Gezol (bass guitar/vocals), Elizaveat (guitar) and Zorugelion (drums).

Zorugelion was now officially a member of the band replacing Samm permanently on drums. The agreement with Elizaveat was for one show only, so in order to keep on playing live Sabbat had to find a new guitar player.

Finding the right person to replace Elizaveat was far from easy and Sabbat did not play a single show in 1990 but the fifth 7" record on Evil Records was released. The Seven Deadly Sins EP consisted of three songs recorded with Samm still on drums. Although unwilling to play live, Elizaveat agreed to help Sabbat in the studio until a new guitar player was found. This made it possible for Sabbat to record a demo tape called Sabbatical Demon which is Zorugelion's first studio recording with the band and also Sabbat's only official demo.

Almost a year had passed since the reunion gig and there was still no sign of a suitable guitar player. In fact, the two shows played in 1989 were the only shows Sabbat had played during the last three years. Without a new guitarist there would not be any gigs and without any gigs the only sensible option was to go to the studio and this is what Sabbat did in October 1990. With Elizaveat doing the guitars the threesome started to record Sabbat's debut full length album Envenom. The recordings were almost finished when a man called Temis Osmond was discovered and it was soon clear he was the guitar player Sabbat had desperately been looking for.

Temis Osmond played a couple of solos on Envenom and although in the album credits he is mentioned only as a special guest he was a full member replacing Elizaveat when the CD came out in 1991 (on Evil Records). After a long struggle with line-up problems Sabbat were suddenly in a most desirable situation. A fresh debut album out and a new line-up: Gezol (bass/vocals), Temis Osmond (guitar/vocals) and Zorugelion (drums).

In September 1991, Sabbat flew to Europe to promote the band and make contacts. A gig was planned in Germany but this did not end up happening. There were also plans for an Austrian label, Lethal Records, to release Envenom in Europe but this as well did not end up taking place.

In early 1992, it was time to enter the studio again to record the second full length album with Temis Osmond doing all the guitars for the first time. Not only did Temis Osmond play all the guitars but he also shared lead vocals with Gezol. Zorugelion provided some vocals for the album as well. Evoke CD was released in the summer of 1992 by Evil Records.

In December 1992, Sabbat were in the studio again in order to record their third album and on top of this Japan's number one underground metal magazine F.E.T.U. released its 13th issue in January 1993 which was dedicated to Sabbat; 33 out of the 36 pages of the magazine were full of Sabbat interviews, pictures and detailed information. The third album Disembody was released by Evil Records in early 1993 but already in the autumn Sabbat were back in the studio again.

1994 was to be the 10th anniversary for the band so a special anniversary album consisting of re-recorded versions of old songs was recorded in autumn 1993. Before this album was released, however, in early 1994 Sabbat recorded the fourth album Fetishism and the CD was swiftly released by Evil Records. Right after Fetishism they released the first part of the anniversary album entitled Black Up Your Soul featuring Elizaveat as a special guest. The 10th anniversary celebrations were marked by a special live show that took place in Nagoya on June 6. During the show the band was joined by special guest stars Samm on drums and Ozny on guitar.

Additionally, a record was released outside Japan for the first time. In the autumn of 1994, Holycaust Records, from the United States, released an MCD entitled Sabbatical Devilucifer that consisted of old unreleased demo recordings. The following year Italian label Entropy Records re-released the debut album Envenom for the European market.

Members

Current members 
 Gezol – lead vocals, bass (1984–present)
 Zorugelion – drums, backing vocals (1990–present)
 Elizabigore – guitars, backing vocals (2016–present)

Former members 
 Temis Osmond – guitars, keyboards, backing vocals (1990–2005)
 Damiazell – guitars, backing vocals (2007–2015)
 Samm a.k.a. Gero – drums, backing vocals (1985–1990)
 Ozny – guitars, backing vocals (1984–1986)
 Valvin – drums, backing vocals (1984–1985)
 Elizaveat – guitars, backing vocals (1984–1991, 2015–2016)

Timeline

Discography

Studio albums 
 Envenom (Evil Records, Japan 1991)
 Evoke (Evil Records, Japan 1992)
 Disembody (Evil Records, Japan 1993)
 Fetishism (Evil Records, Japan 1994)
 The Dwelling (Evil Records, Japan 1996)
 Karisma (Iron Pegasus Records, Germany 1999)
 Satanasword (Iron Pegasus Records, Germany 2000)
 Karmagmassacre (Iron Pegasus Records, Germany 2003)
 Sabbatrinity (Iron Pegasus Records, Germany 2011)

Live albums 
 Live at Blokula (Evil Records, Japan 1995)
 Live 666 – Japanese Harmageddon (Evil Records, Japan 1996)
 Live Curse (Heavy Metal Super Star Records, Japan 1999)
 Live Kindergarten (Heavy Metal Super Star Records, Japan 1999)
 Live Devil (Heavy Metal Super Star Records, Japan 2000)
 Live Panica (Heavy Metal Super Star Records, Japan 2000)
 Iberian Harmageddon (Hibernia Productions, Portugal 2000)
 Live Revenge (Heavy Metal Super Star Records, Japan 2000)
 Russian Harmageddon (Satanic Assault Productions, Brazil 2000)
 Live Meltdown (Heavy Metal Super Star Records, Japan 2001)
 Live Nuts (Heavy Metal Super Star Records, Japan 2001)
 Live Festa (Heavy Metal Super Star Records, Japan 2001)
 Dietsland Harmageddon (Berzerker Records, Holland 2001)
 Minami-Kyushu Harmageddon (Infernal Tharsh Records, Japan 2001)
 Live Torture (Heavy Metal Super Star Records, Japan 2001)
 Live Guanafight (Heavy Metal Super Star Records, Japan 2002)
 Live Lovefire (Heavy Metal Super Star Records, Japan 2002)
 Live Batan-Q (Heavy Metal Super Star Records, Japan 2002)
 Live Izumoden (Heavy Metal Super Star Records, Japan 2003)
 Gezonslaught (Ososo Records, Japan 2003)
 Valvinonslaught (Infernal Thrash Records, Japan 2003)
 Elizaveatonslaught (Heavy Metal Super Star Records, Japan 2003)
 Naniwa Tepoddonslaught (Evil Dead Records, Japan 2003)
 Live Hamagurism (Heavy Metal Super Star Records, Japan 2003)
 Hamaguri Resurrection (Assaulter Productions, United States 2004)
 Live Undertakers (Temis Osmond) (Heavy Metal Super Star Records, Japan 2004)
 Live Resurrection (Monster Nation / Iron Tyrant, Sweden / Italy 2004)
 Live Undertakers (Zorugelion) (Heavy Metal Super Star Records, Japan 2004)
 Live Sabbatical Hamaguri Queen (Nuclear War Now! Productions, United States 2005)
 Satanas Francisconslaught (Bay Area Sabbatical Maniacs Records, United States 2005)
 Brooklyn Blackfire (Heavy Metal Super Star, Japan 2005)
 Geionslaught 1986 (Time Before Time, Poland 2006)
 Tribute to Temis (Heavy Metal Super Star, Japan 2006)
 Sabbademonical Liveslaught (Stygian Shadows Productions, Hungary 2007)
 Go Gezol Go! (Heavy Metal Super Star, Japan 2007)
 Live in BKK (Heavy Metal Super Star, Japan 2007)
 Live in Singapore (Heavy Metal Super Star, Japan 2007)
 Hamaguri Hihoukan (Ososo Records, Japan 2007)
 Go Gezol Go! (Heavy Metal Super Star Records, Japan 2007)
 Ishidamien Infects Inferno (Heavy Metal Super Star Records, Japan 2007)
 Xenophobiac Xanthous Xenogenesis (Heavy Metal Super Star Records, Japan 2007)
 Hamaguri Hihoukan (Ososo Records, Japan 2007)
 Live in Singapore (Heavy Metal Super Star Records, Japan 2007)
 Live Resurrection (Iron Tyrant, Italy 2007)
 Live in San Francisconslaught (Assaulter Productions / Depths of Hell Records, USA 2008)
 Feel Finnish Fire (Heavy Metal Super Star Records, Japan 2008)
 Sabbatical Milanonslaught (Iron Tyrant, Italy 2008)
 Uda's Ultimate Unison (Heavy Metal Super Star Records, Japan 2008)
 Psychedelic Pounding Pain (Heavy Metal Super Star Records, Japan 2008)

Singles / EPs 
 Sabbat (Evil Records, Japan 1985)
 Born by Evil Blood (Evil Records, Japan 1987)
 Desecration (Evil Records, Japan 1988)
 The Devil's Sperm Is Cold (Evil Records, Japan 1989)
 The Seven Deadly Sins (Evil Records, Japan 1990)
 European Harmageddon (Merciless Records, Germany 1997)
 Scandinavian Harmageddon (Primitive Art Productions, Sweden 1997)
 East European Harmageddon (View Beyond Records, Czech Republic 1998)
 American Harmageddon (Holycaust Records, United States 1998)
 Asian Halmageddon (Evil Records, China 1998)
 African Harmageddon (Mganga Records, Tanzania 1998)
 Oceanic Harmageddon (Way of Life Records, Australia 1999)
 South American Harmageddon (Mega Therion Records / Sylphorium Records, Brasil / Colombia 1999)
 Sabbatical Demonslaught (View Beyond Records, Czech Republic 1999
 Baltic Harmageddon (Sadistic Sodomizer, Latvia 2000)
 French Harmageddon (End All Life Productions, France 2000)
 Brazilian Demonslaught (Live Recordings Attack, Brazil 2002)
 Demonslaught Sverige (Monster Nation, Sweden 2003)
 Naniwa Harmageddon (Ososo Records, Japan 2003)
 Zorugelionslaught (Infernal Thrash Records, Japan 2003)
 Temis Osmonslaught (Infernal Thrash Records, Japan 2004)
 Gezonslaught (Infernal Thrash Records, Japan 2004)
 Fetus Tribute (Holycaust Records, United States 2004)
 Sabbatical Rehearsalucifer (Time Before Time, Poland 2004)
 Icelandic & Greenlandic Demonslaught (View Beyond, Czech Republic 2006)
 Finnish Demonslaught (Metal Warning, Finland 2008)

Compilation albums 
 Black up Your Soul... (Evil Records, Japan 1994)
 Sabbatical Devilucifer (Holycaust Records, United States 1994)
 ...for Satan and Sacrifice (Evil Records, Japan 1995)
 Bloody Countess (Holycaust Records, United States 1996)
 Sabbatical Rites (Iron Pegasus Records, Germany 1999)
 VenoMetal (Sons of Satan, Brazil 2000)
 Live Wacko (Heavy Metal Super Star, Japan 2003)
 Brigitte Harmageddon (Brigittefan Records, Australia 2003)
 Sabbatical Satanachrist Slaughter – Bay Area Harmageddon (Nuclear War Now! Productions, United States 2003)
 Sabbat (Asian Hordes, Philippines 2004)
 Envenometal (Heavy Metal Super Star Records, Japan 2004)
 Sabbatical Holocaust (Time Before Time Records, Poland 2004)
 ...And the Sabbatical Queen (RIP Records, United States 2004)
 Mion's Hill – 20th Anniversary Special Release 1984–2004 (Iron Pegasus Records, Germany 2004)
 ...To Praise the Sabbatical Queen (Iron Pegasus Records, Germany 2004)
 Sabbatical 25 Years Kamikaze Demonslaught (Deathbringer Records, Germany 2008)
 The Harmageddon Vinylucifer Singles (Iron Pegasus Records, Germany 2008)
 Polish Demonslaught (Hard Rocker Magazine, Poland 2008)

Split releases 
 Far East Gate in Inferno (Evil Records, Japan 1994)
 Headbangers Against Disco with Gehennah, Infernö and Bestial Warlust (Primitive Art Productions, Sweden 1997)
 Thrashing Holocaust (Necropolis Records, United States 1999)
 The Bulldozer Armageddon Volume 1 with Imperial (Warlord Records, Italy 2000)
 Sabbatical Splitombstone with Unpure (Iron Pegasus Records, Germany 2001)
 The Return of Darkness and Hate (Drakkar Productions, France 2001)
 Antarctic Harmageddon (Heavy Metal Super Star Records, Japan 2001)
 Split with Gorgon (View Beyond, Czech Republic 2001)
 Split with Unholy Grave (The Sky Is Red Records, United States 2001)
 Split with Terror Squad (Legions of Death Records, France 2001)
 Kamikaze Splitting Roar with Abigail (From Beyond Productions, Holland 2004)
 Live Vanguard with Ground Zero (Heavy Metal Super Star Records, Japan 2004)
 Live Undertakers (Gezol) with Zombie Ritual (Heavy Metal Super Star Records, Japan 2004)
 Tokyo Genocidemonslaught with Asbestos (Metal Crusade Productions, Japan 2005)
 Sabbatical Desaterminator with Desaster (Witchhammer Productions, Thailand 2005)
 Split with Forever Winter (Holycaust, United States 2005)
 Sabbatical Gorgonslaught with Gorgon (Witchhammer, Thailand 2005)
 Sabbatical Siamesechristbeheading with Surrender of Divinity (Witchhammer, Thailand 2006)
 Bloodlust Regime 1942 – The Syonan-To Massacres... with Iron Fist (Necromancer Records, Germany 2006)
 Sabbatical Goat Semen with Goat Semen (Witchhammer, Thailand 2006)
 Split with Metalucifer (Dream Evil Records, Italy 2008)

References

External links 
 
 BNR Metal Pages – Sabbat

1983 establishments in Japan
Japanese black metal musical groups
Japanese musical trios
Japanese thrash metal musical groups
Musical groups established in 1983